Group H of the 2014–15 EuroChallenge consisted of Uşak Sportif, BC Šiauliai, Enisey Krasnoyarsk and BC Tsmoki-Minsk. Play began on 4 November and ended on 16 December 2014.

Teams

Standings

References

Group H
2014–15 in Russian basketball
2014–15 in Turkish basketball
2014–15 in Lithuanian basketball
2014–15 in Belarusian basketball